Edward Willis Barnett (May 8, 1899 – November 8, 1987) was an American naval officer, fencer, and art photographer.

Barnett grew up in Birmingham, Alabama and attended the United States Naval Academy at Annapolis, Maryland. He served in France during World War I. He remained in Europe after the war. As an accomplished fencer with the épée , he competed in the 1928 Summer Olympics in Amsterdam for the United States, but won only one match.

Barnett became acquainted with art photographer Man Ray while living in Paris' Montparnasse district. Through him, Barnett joined an artistic circle that included Ford Madox Ford, Gertrude Stein, Guy Pene du Bois and Marcel Duchamp.

Barnett's skills as an art photographer were recognized by the Photographic Society of America and the Federation Internationale d'Art Photographique. His prints have been acquired by the Metropolitan Museum of Art and the Museum of Modern Art in New York City, as well as by the Birmingham Museum of Art in his home state and the Kodak Camera Club's permanent picture collection.

Barnett founded the Alabama Museum of Photography and the Alabama International Exhibition of Photography.

References

External links
 

1899 births
1987 deaths
American male épée fencers
20th-century American photographers
United States Naval Academy alumni
20th-century American naval officers
Olympic fencers of the United States
Fencers at the 1928 Summer Olympics
Sportspeople from Atlanta
Sportspeople from Birmingham, Alabama
19th-century American people